Cuvânt moldovenesc was a magazine from Chișinău, Bessarabia, founded in 1913.

History
The editor in chief was Nicolae Alexandri, redactors were Pan Halippa and Simion Murafa, and among the authors were: Ion Pelivan, Daniel Ciugureanu, Mihail Ciachir, Gheorghe Stârcea, T. Inculeţ. After May 1917, its successor was Școala Moldovenească of Onisifor Ghibu.

References

Bibliography 
 Georgeta Răduică, Dicţionarul presei româneşti (1731–1918), Editura Ştiinţifică, București,

External links
  Cuvânt Moldovenesc at enciclopediaromaniei.ro

1913 establishments in the Russian Empire
1917 disestablishments in Russia
Bessarabia Governorate
Defunct literary magazines published in Europe
Defunct magazines published in Russia
Literary magazines published in Moldova
Magazines established in 1913
Magazines disestablished in 1917
Mass media in Chișinău
Romanian-language magazines